Michael Gluck (born March 8, 1983) is the founder of VGM, a market research firm and the largest provider of custom research to the video game industry.

VGM 
In 2007, at the age of 24, Michael started VGM with $5,000 in savings and grew the company to $20,000,000 in lifetime sales by the age of 30. As of 2017, VGM had serviced more than 50 video game companies, as well as industry leaders in entertainment, media, and technology.

Piano Squall 
As a college student, Gluck performed piano concerts and released an album under the stage name “Piano Squall” to raise money for the National Multiple Sclerosis Society, in support of a cure for the disease that took his grandmother’s life.

Other ventures 
Outside of the market research industry, Gluck is the co-owner of Court Street Grocers. Opening with a 29 Zagat rating and widespread critical acclaim, the Brooklyn-based sandwich chain has three locations and is among the highest reviewed restaurants in New York.

In 2013, Gluck co-founded and produced a video game music band that is currently on tour in the United States, Australia, and the Middle East. 

In 2016, Gluck produced the world premiere of Unlikely Heroes, a play authored by his father Dr. Charles Gluck, which debuted in Boca Raton, Florida to critical acclaim.

Education 
Gluck studied business at the University of Pennsylvania and graduated in the class of 2005.

Personal life 
Gluck was born in Miami and grew up in Hollywood, Florida. He enjoys piano, composing music, and chess.

References 

1983 births
Living people
People from Hollywood, Florida
University of Pennsylvania alumni
American company founders